November 26 - Eastern Orthodox liturgical calendar - November 28

All fixed commemorations below are observed on December 10 by Eastern Orthodox Churches on the Old Calendar.

For November 27, Orthodox Churches on the Old Calendar commemorate the Saints listed on November 14.

Saints

 Venerable Moses.
 17 Monk-martyrs in India (4th century)
 Venerable Pinuphrius of Egypt (4th century)
 Great-Martyr James of Persia (421) 
 Venerable Romanus the Wonderworker of Cilicia (5th century) (see also: February 9)
 Venerable Nathaniel of Nitria (6th century)
 Venerable Palladius of Thessalonica (6th-7th century)

Pre-Schism Western saints

 Saints Facundus and Primitivus (c. 300) 
 Saint Valerian, Bishop of Aquileia in the north of Italy (389) 
 Saint John Angeloptes, Bishop of Ravenna in Italy 430-433 (433) 
 Saint Seachnall (Sechnall), first Bishop of Dunsauglin in Meath in Ireland and later served in Armagh (457) 
 Saint Maximus of Riez, Abbot of Lérins Abbey in France in 426, he became Bishop of Riez (460) 
 Saint Congar of Congresbury, Bishop of Somerset (520)
 Saint Siffred of Carpentras (Siffrein, Syffroy, Suffredus), a monk at Lérins Abbey and later Bishop of Carpentras in the south of France (c. 540)
 Saint Severinus, a hermit who lived near Paris in France (c. 540) 
 Saint Gallgo, founder of Llanallgo in Anglesey in Wales (6th century)
 Saint Acharius, Bishop of Noyon-Tournai in Belgium (640) 
 Saint Bilihildis, foundress of the convent of Altenmünster in Mainz (c. 710)
 Saint Fergus, born in Ireland, he was a bishop who preached among the Picts in Perthshire, Caithness, Buchan and Forfarshire in Scotland (c. 721)
 Saint Vergilius of Salzburg (Fergal), Abbot of St Peter's in Salzburg and Bishop, the Apostle of Carinthia (784) 
 Saint Apollinaris, fourteenth Abbot of Montecassino Abbey in Italy, abbot for eleven years (828)

Post-Schism Orthodox saints

 Venerable Theodosius of Tarnovo (1363)  ( see also: February 17 )
 Saint James, Bishop and Wonderworker of Rostov (1392)
 Saint Damaskinos the Studite, Bishop of Liti and Rendini (1577)
 Venerable Diodorus, Abbot of Yuriev Monastery (George Hill), Solovki (1633)  ( see also: August 16 )
 Blessed Andrei (Ogorodnikov) of Simbirsk, Fool-for-Christ (1841)

New martyrs and confessors

 New Hieromartyr Nicholas (Dobronravov), Archbishop of Vladimir (1937)
 New Hieromartyrs Nicholas Andreyev, Boris Ivanosky and Basil Sokolov of Moscow, Protopresbyters (1937)
 New Hieromartyrs Theodore Dorofiev of Moscow, Alexei Speransky of Moscow, John Glazkov of Alma-Ata, Sergius Amanov, John Khrustalev, Sergius Brednikov, Nicholas Pokrovsky, Priests (1937)
 New Hieromartyr Cronides (Lyubimov) of Holy Trinity-St. Sergius Lavra, Archimandrite, and with him Seraphim (Krestianinov), Abbot, and Xenophont (Bondarenko), Hieromonk, all of St. Sergius Lavra (1937)
 New Hieromartyrs Ioasaf Boyev, Archimandrite of Nikolskoye Monastery, Moscow; and Nicholas Nikolay Saltykov, hieromonk of the St. Nicholas-Peshnosha Monastery, Moscow (1937)
 New Hieromartyrs Alexei Gavrin; Appolos Fedoseyev, hieromonk of Moscow; and Nikon Belyaev, Archimandrite of the Staro- Golutvin Monastery, Kolomna (1937)
 Martyr John Emelyanov (1937)

Icons

 Icon of the Most Holy Theotokos "of the Sign" at Novgorod (1170)
 Icon of the Most Holy Theotokos "Kursk Root" (1295)
 Icon of the Most Holy Theotokos "of Abalek" in Siberia (1637) 
 Icon of the Mother of God of Tsarskoe Selo (1753)
 Icon of the Mother of God "Zlatoustovskaya" (1848)  (see also: March 3)
 Icon of the Mother of God "Seraphim-Ponetaevka" (1879)

Other commemorations

 Uncovering of the relics (1192) of St. Vsevolod (Gabriel) of Pskov (1138)
 Synaxis of the New Martyrs and Confessors of Radonezh.
 Repose of Hieromonk Athanasius of Iveron Monastery, Mt. Athos (1973)

Icon gallery

Notes

References

Sources
 November 27 / December 10. Orthodox Calendar (PRAVOSLAVIE.RU).
 December 10 / November 27. Holy Trinity Russian Orthodox Church (A parish of the Patriarchate of Moscow).
 November 27. OCA - The Lives of the Saints.
 The Autonomous Orthodox Metropolia of Western Europe and the Americas (ROCOR). St. Hilarion Calendar of Saints for the year of our Lord 2004. St. Hilarion Press (Austin, TX). p. 89.
 The Twenty-Seventh Day of the Month of November. Orthodoxy in China.
 November 27. Latin Saints of the Orthodox Patriarchate of Rome.
 The Roman Martyrology. Transl. by the Archbishop of Baltimore. Last Edition, According to the Copy Printed at Rome in 1914. Revised Edition, with the Imprimatur of His Eminence Cardinal Gibbons. Baltimore: John Murphy Company, 1916. p. 365-366.
 Rev. Richard Stanton. A Menology of England and Wales, or, Brief Memorials of the Ancient British and English Saints Arranged According to the Calendar, Together with the Martyrs of the 16th and 17th Centuries. London: Burns & Oates, 1892. pp. 567–568.
Greek Sources
 Great Synaxaristes:  27 ΝΟΕΜΒΡΙΟΥ. ΜΕΓΑΣ ΣΥΝΑΞΑΡΙΣΤΗΣ.
  Συναξαριστής. 27 Νοεμβρίου. ECCLESIA.GR. (H ΕΚΚΛΗΣΙΑ ΤΗΣ ΕΛΛΑΔΟΣ). 
  27/11/2015. Ορθόδοξος Συναξαριστής. 
Russian Sources
  10 декабря (27 ноября). Православная Энциклопедия под редакцией Патриарха Московского и всея Руси Кирилла (электронная версия). (Orthodox Encyclopedia - Pravenc.ru).
  27 ноября по старому стилю / 10 декабря по новому стилю. Русская Православная Церковь - Православный церковный календарь на 2018 год.

November in the Eastern Orthodox calendar